Trinitrogen also known as the azide radical is an unstable molecule composed of three nitrogen atoms. Two arrangements are possible: a linear form with double bonds and charge transfer, and a cyclic form. Both forms are highly unstable. More-stable derivatives exist, such as when it acts as a ligand, and it may participate in azido nitration, which is a reaction between sodium azide and ammonium cerium nitrate.

The linear form of N3 was discovered in 1956 by B. A. Thrush by photolysis of hydrogen azide. As a linear and symmetric molecule, it has D∞h symmetry, with a nitrogen–nitrogen bond length averaging 1.8115 Å. The first excited electronic state, A2Σu, is 4.56 eV above the ground state.

The cyclic form was identified in 2003 by N. Hansen and A. M. Wodtke using ultraviolet photolysis of chlorine azide. Although the reaction yielded mostly the linear form,  about 20% of the molecules were cyclic.

References

External links

Homonuclear triatomic molecules
Nitrogen compounds
Allotropes of nitrogen